Damion Poitier (born June 4, 1976) is an American actor and stuntman, best known for his role as Chains in Payday 2. He made an uncredited appearance as Thanos in The Avengers (2012), the character's first appearance in the Marvel Cinematic Universe (in future appearances, Josh Brolin would take over the role). He has also had roles in Captain America: Civil War, Star Trek, Jarhead, and Never Die Alone.

Early life 
Poitier was born in Philadelphia, and moved to Massachusetts in his early childhood. He became interested in acting after watching a man who looked "just like [his] grandfather" appear on television talk about acting. He acted through school, but got his first "professional" job as a scare actor at Spooky World. Poitier's first real acting job was a stunt performer on Sheena.

Personal life 
Poitier practices Universalism. He is unsure if he is related to Sidney Poitier, but knows that their ancestors "hail from the same island".

Filmography

Films

Short films

Television

Video games

References

External links 
 

Living people
1982 births
American male film actors
American male television actors
American male video game actors
American male voice actors
Male actors from Philadelphia
Male actors from Pennsylvania
Actors from Pennsylvania
African-American male actors
Male motion capture actors
21st-century American male actors
21st-century African-American people
20th-century African-American people